Jane Davidson (born 19 March 1957) is a Welsh former Labour politician, the former Assembly Member for Pontypridd, and served as minister for environment, sustainability and housing in the Welsh Government. She also previously served as the Welsh vice-president of the Ramblers' Association, stepping down when appointed minister for environment, sustainability and housing in 2007. She announced in 2008 that she would not be seeking re-election to the assembly in 2011.

Professional career 
Prior to her election to the Welsh Assembly Davidson was a member of Cardiff City Council. In the Assembly she was minister for environment and sustainability in Wales from 2007 to 2011 where she was responsible for the Welsh Government agreeing to make sustainable development  its central organising principle. Prior to that she was minister for education and lifelong learning where she introduced a new foundation phase for 3- to 7-year-olds, the Welsh Baccalaureate and Education for Sustainable Development and Global Citizenship (ESDGC) into the Welsh curriculum.

In 2011, following her ministerial career and subsequent move to West Wales as planned, Davidson took up employment as director of the Wales Institute for Sustainability at the local Trinity St David University shortly afterwards, which intends to introduce sustainability content into every student's experience from 2013.

In 2017, Jane was guest faculty in the Executive Education for Sustainability Leadership programme at Harvard University's T.H. Chan School of Public Health.

Contributions to public policy
Davidson was the third most influential environmentalist in the UK for the Independent on Sunday in 2009 and has been Resource magazine's number one and two in 2009 and 2010 for her work on waste. She holds honorary fellowships from CIW (Chartered Institute of Waste) and CIWEM (Chartered Institute of Water and Environmental Management) and is a member of WWF's UK Council of Global Ambassadors. Davidson was a judge on the 2011 Green Awards and is a member of the Telegraph's summit team writing about the green economy in the run up to Rio+20.

References 

1957 births
Living people
Welsh Labour members of the Senedd
Wales AMs 1999–2003
Wales AMs 2003–2007
Wales AMs 2007–2011
Politicians from Cardiff
Alumni of the University of Birmingham
Alumni of the University of Wales
Councillors in Cardiff
Members of the Welsh Assembly Government
Female members of the Senedd
People educated at Malvern St James
20th-century British women politicians
Women members of the Welsh Assembly Government
Women councillors in Wales